AAUSat-3,  (Aalborg University CubeSat-3), is the third CubeSat built and operated by students from the Aalborg University in Denmark. It was launched on 25 February 2013 from the Satish Dhawan Space Centre in India on a Polar Satellite Launch Vehicle (PSLV) launch vehicle (PSLV-C20). AAUSat-3 carries two Automatic Identification System (AIS-1 and AIS-2) receivers as the main payload.

Educational objective 
The primary purpose of satellite construction at University of Aalborg is to give the students engineering experience beyond what is normally achieved within a master's degree program. The design, implementation, and manufacturing were carried out by students, with only two exceptions: the manufacturing of the mechanical structure (carried out by the department workshop in alu7075), and the raw non-mounted PCBs. The project is funded mainly by Aalborg University and by Danish Maritime Safety Administration (DaMSA ), along with other sponsors.

Scientific objective 
The purpose of the satellite project was to find out if it was possible to receive Automatic Identification System (AIS) signals from a 1U CubeSat.

The spacecraft was designed to operate on a non-centralized basis so it would be able to continue functioning even when certain subsystems failed. It carried two automated identification system (AIS) receivers - one based on SDR principle. The images recorded by the satellite were later transmitted to the ground station located at Aalborg University, from which they were made accessible for the general public.

History 
Student satellite activities at Aalborg University (AAU) started in 2003 as a result of AAU's involvement in the first pure Danish research satellite, Ørsted, which was successfully launched in 1999. AAUSat-3's predecessors were AAU CubeSat (launched in 2003), and AAUSat-2 (launched in 2008). Students from AAU also participated in SSETI Express (launched in 2005), a student satellite initiative by European Space Agency (ESA) Education. The construction of AAUSat-3 began in the fall of 2007.

The satellite prototype was tested on a stratospheric balloon flight in October 2009 as part the BEXUS (Balloon Experiments for University Students) program, which allows European students to test scientific experiments in high altitude conditions. The balloon test served as an excellent opportunity to test the AIS receivers with an extended field of view (FOV) and to acquire realistic samples for further development of the final payload receivers. The payload on BEXUS was called NAVIS (North Atlantic Vessel Identification System).

Operations 

AAUSat-3 was launched on 25 February 2013 on PSLV-C20. Operations were a success. 9,000 AIS messages were received on a daily basis and downloaded to the mission control center (MCC), located in Aalborg, Denmark. All subsystems were tested and running. The first 100 days of operation were very successful. No degradation of the satellite was observed, all subsystems were working, and the primary payload – an AIS receiver – was working correctly.

Two critical situations occurred during the first 100 days:

28 February 2013 at 06:08: The last message for some days was received. During the previous 24 hours, battery voltage was decreasing, and temperature readings indicated that AAUSat-3 was steady pointing the side without solar cells towards the Sun. During the last pass over Aalborg, it was observed that battery voltage was slowly decreasing. The situation was discussed and analyzed during the day, and it was decided to instruct AAUSat-3 on all upcoming passes to switch off beacon mode because it was using power. No further attempt was taken to make contact during the weekend in order to preserve and recharge the satellite's battery. All passes were supervised. There was total silence until 4 March at 17:52 where the ground station in Aalborg requestes and received a beacon. The beacon showed an uptime of 1 day 19 hours, that everything was working, and that more than 7,000 AIS messages had been received. Everything went back to normal. The requested beacon also showed a high number of reboots, possibly due to low battery voltage. Due to this event, AAUSat-3 was set to tumble slowly – 2 rotations for every 100-minute orbit – to avoid a repetition of the problem.

24 May 2013: The power system (EPS) on AAUSat-3 rejected multi-frame communication packages from the ground. During four passes (500 minutes), the students analyzed the situation and inspected the C source for the EPS server, and a solution was found. A new package was sent to AAUSat-3, and normal EPS operation was re-established. During the event, the rest of the satellite – due to the decentralized design – was working. During the first 100 days, close to 800,000 AIS packages were received and downloaded.

10–11 June 2013: Two new software images for the SDR AIS receiver (AIS-2) were uploaded. It took approximately 1.5 paths to upload a full AIS receiver image. The satellite showed improvement and was newly capable of sampling and decoding in real time. First metrics showed a capacity of around 6,000 AIS messages per hour on average.

 25 February 2014: One year up in space. AAUSat-3 was fully functioning, and AIS measurements were done on a regular basis. A ground station was established at Thule (Qaanaaq), Greenland, for extended download capacity. Energy production was stable but low, so the mission was interleaved with hours or days for charging batteries. New uploaded algorithms showed reception of approximately 8,000 messages per hour and real-time performance, which meant that decoding took less time than sampling and was carried out in parallel. Due to the ground station at Thule, it was possible to carry out real-time supervision, measuring and downloading at the same time. So only a few seconds after detection, the information was available in Aalborg at the MCC.

17 September 2014: The last message was received from the satellite.

1 October 2014: The project at AAU declared the end of the AAUSat-3 mission due to battery problems (continuous decline in power production). The project is grateful for the experience gained throughout the mission.

Satellite subsystem strategy 
AAUSat-3 was based on a decentralized concept with no dedicated master. The idea behind this approach was to achieve a modular satellite that, in many cases, would be able to function even when certain subsystems failed. For that reason, the must-have subsystems (EPS and COM) were designed to be simple and robust, whereas subsystems like AIS-2 were by necessity more complex, with a concomitant higher failure rate.

The power system (EPS) acts as intelligent supervisor and watchdog. AAUSat-3 consists of several sub-systems:

On the ground segment, there were:

 CDH: Command and Datahandling System
 GND: Ground Station
 MCC: Mission Control Center

All internal and satellite-to-ground communication was carried out using CSP protocol.

Technical specifications 
The technical specifications was:

See also 

 List of CubeSats

References

External links 
 Official homepage 

Student satellites
Aalborg University
Spacecraft launched in 2013
CubeSats